Ayoub Sadni (born 23 April 1999) is a Moroccan Paralympic athlete specializing in sprints. He represented Morocco at the 2020 Summer Paralympics.

Career
Sadni represented Morocco at the 2020 Summer Paralympics in the 400 metres T47 event and won a gold medal.

References 

1999 births
Living people
Sportspeople from Rabat
Paralympic athletes of Morocco
Medalists at the World Para Athletics Championships
Athletes (track and field) at the 2020 Summer Paralympics
Medalists at the 2020 Summer Paralympics
Paralympic gold medalists for Morocco
Paralympic medalists in athletics (track and field)
Moroccan male sprinters